Lloyd Roby (born 3 January 1999) is a professional rugby league footballer who plays as a  or  for the Keighley Cougars in the Betfred Championship.  

Roby previously played for the Widnes Vikings.

Background
Roby was born in Warrington, Cheshire, England.

Career

Widnes Vikings
In 2017 he made his Widnes début in the Challenge cup against the Warrington Wolves (his hometown club).

Injury caused him to miss the 2018 season and he did not appear again for Widnes until 2019. A brief loan period at Oldham was the only interruption to Roby's career with the Vikings during which he made 52 appearances, scoring 23 tries and kicking 3 goals.

Keighley Cougars
At the end of the 2022 season, Roby was released by Widnes but signed a two-year deal with Keighley soon after.

References

External links
Widnes Vikings profile

1999 births
Living people
English rugby league players
Keighley Cougars players
Oldham R.L.F.C. players
Rugby league players from Warrington
Rugby league wingers
Widnes Vikings players